Spathoptera albilatera is a species of beetle in the family Cerambycidae, and the only species in the genus Spathoptera. It was described by Audinet-Serville in 1868.

References

Hemilophini
Beetles described in 1868